Jesús "Chus" Mateo Díez (born January 23, 1969) is a Spanish professional basketball coach. He is the current head coach of Real Madrid of the Liga ACB and the EuroLeague.

Coaching career
Mateo spent most of his career as an assistant coach. He began coaching at the youth basketball teams of the Augustinian College of Madrid and Real Madrid, where he worked from 1991 to 1995. Between 1993 and 1997, he was an assistant coach of Spain U16.

On 27 June 2006, Mateo was appointed by CAI Zaragoza, becoming a head coach for the first time in his career.

In 2012, Mateo went abroad, signing with the Shanxi Zhongyu Brave Dragons of the Chinese Basketball Association.

In 2014, he became Pablo Laso's assistant at Real Madrid. Apart from winning a lot of trophies as Laso's understudy, Mateo also led Madrid to victories as an interim head coach. Under his rein, on 23 December 2021, an extremely depleted due to COVID-19 Real Madrid squad won against highly favored CSKA Moscow. Mateo also led Madrid to a 3–1 victory in the 2022 ACB playoff final series against Barcelona to win a record 36th league title for Los Blancos.

On 5 July 2022, Mateo was promoted to a permanent head coach role after Real Madrid parted ways with Laso.

Personal life
Mateo has his own basketball academy named after him.

References

External links
Jesus Mateo basketball profile 
Jesús Mateo  Coach Plantilla  Real Madrid CF 

1969 births
Living people
Real Madrid basketball coaches
Baloncesto Málaga coaches
Baloncesto Fuenlabrada coaches
Spanish basketball coaches
Sportspeople from Madrid